Tomáš Čermák (born February 8, 1943 in Ostrava) is a Czech engineer and rector of Technical University of Ostrava (VŠB-TUO).

Life 

Tomáš Čermák graduated in 1964 from Brno University of Technology at the faculty of electrical engineering. From 1964 to 1968 he worked as an engineer for the Vitkovice Steel Company. In 1968 he became senior researcher at the VŠB – Technical University of Ostrava. In 1981 he became an assistant professor in the Department of Electrical Engineering. In 1974 he earned his Ph.D. in the field of electrical drives at the Brno University of Technology.

From 1977 to 1990 Čermák was deputy head, head and vice-dean of the Department of Electrical Machines and Drives at VŠB – TUO. In 1991 he earned a full professorship. 
 
Čermák was rector of the Technical University of Ostrava from 1990 to 1997, and vice-rector for R&D and Foreign Affairs from 1997 to 2003. He serves as the rector of VŠB – TUO since 2003.

Čermák is a member of numerous national and international committees, such as vice-president of Czech Universities Council, Member of General Assembly of Czech Academy of Science (AVČR) and founding member of the Czech Engineering Academy (IAČR) and International Centre for Eyecare Education (ICEE). He is also consultant for the Czech government as a member of the State Committee for Scientific Degrees and Chairman of Engineering Division of Grant Agency of the Czech Republic (GAČR).

Since 1997 he has been Chairman of the Board of the Vesuvius (formerly Hinckley) Slavia Group and Chairman of Supervisory at OZOBEL.

Čermák is an author of nine books and numerous articles in journals and papers from national and international conferences.

References

External links
 Website Tomáš Čermák (VŠB-TUO) 

Living people
1943 births
Czech engineers
Academic staff of the Technical University of Ostrava